Voices of Wonder a.k.a. Voice of Wonder Records was one of the most important rock record labels in Oslo, Norway in the early 1990s. The label was fronted by a small and intimate record store on Olaf Ryes plass, which in addition to the labels own artists specialized in the English Earache Records and the American Sub Pop labels.

In the second half of the 1990s the store changed focus, from metal and grindcore to dance and electronic music. This alienated many of the old customers, and the label and store never managed to gain entry on the new scene. Thus, today the store is no more and the label is less active than before.

Voices of Wonder also distributed for Euronymous of Mayhem's Deathlike Silence Productions.

Voice of Wonder Records AS changed name to Voices Music & Entertainment in 2001, and now operates as VME's sublabel.

Roster
 The 3rd and the Mortal
 Anal Babes
 Carpe Tenebrum
 The Disciplines
 Dog Age
 Enslaved
 Full Moon
 Grady
 Mayhem
 Motorpsycho
 Origami Teknika
 Red Harvest
 Sister Rain
 The Tables
 Tangled Edge

See also
 List of record labels

References 
 Red Harvest. Accessed August 16, 2005
 Motorpsycho. Accessed August 16, 2005

External links
 Official site

Notes 

Norwegian record labels
Rock record labels
Heavy metal record labels
Grindcore record labels
Electronic dance music record labels
Electronic music record labels